Neither Am I is the debut studio album by Irish band Bell X1, released on 13 October 2000. It features a number of songs previously written and recorded with Damien Rice, the lead singer of the band's former incarnation, Juniper, and with producer and Crowded House bassist, Nick Seymour.

Track listing
All songs written by Brian Crosby, David Geraghty, Paul Noonan and Dominic Philips except where noted.

 "Pinball Machine" (Crosby, Geraghty, Noonan, Philips, Nick Seymour)  – 3:57
 "The Money"  – 4:09
 "Man on Mir"  – 4:04
 "Volcano" (Crosby, Geraghty, Noonan, Philips, Rice) – 4:37
 "Slowset"  – 3:58
 "Godsong"  – 4:41
 "Blue Rinse Baby"  – 2:51
 "Offshore"  – 4:09
 "Beautiful Madness"  – 4:37
 "Face" (Crosby, Geraghty, Noonan, Philips, Rice) – 2:54
 "Little Sister"  – 3:33
 "Deep"  – 3:45

References

2000 albums
Bell X1 (band) albums